Following is a list of justices of the Idaho Supreme Court. Idaho was made a territory on March 4, 1863, and the first justices of the Territorial Supreme Court were appointed by President Abraham Lincoln. Following statehood in 1890, the state constitution provided for three justices. By an amendment in 1919, the number was increased and fixed at five, composed of a chief justice and four associate justices, which commenced in January 1921 and remains the present size of the court.

The first female justice on the court was Linda Copple Trout, she was first appointed in 1992 and later served as chief justice. Cathy Silak was appointed the following year and was elected to the court in 1994, being the first woman to be elected to Idaho Supreme Court. Silak served through 2000, suffering the only election defeat for an incumbent on the court since 1944. Following the retirement of Trout in 2007, the court was all-male until the election of Robyn Brody in November 2016. With the appointment of Colleen Zahn in 2021, the court has two females.

Idaho Territorial Court
Chief justices of the Idaho Territorial Court
 Sidney Edgerton (March 10, 1863 – July 25, 1864)
 Silas Woodson (July 25, 1864 – February 28, 1865)
 John R. McBride (February 28, 1865 – July 18, 1868)
 Thomas J. Bowers (July 18, 1868 – April 9, 1869)
 David Noggle (April 9, 1869 – January 14, 1875)
 Madison E. Hollister (January 14, 1875 – January 13, 1879)
 William George Thompson (January 13, 1879 – June 10, 1879)
 J. T. Morgan (June 10, 1879 – August 14, 1885)
 James B. Hays (August 14, 1885 – September 29, 1888)
 Hugh W. Weir (September 29, 1888 – May 1889)
 James H. Beatty (May 1889 – July 3, 1890)

State supreme court

 Beginning in 1983, the Chief Justice was determined by an election among the five justices of the court. Previously the position rotated to the justice with the least amount of time remaining in his term.
^defeated in statewide election: Dunlap (1944), Silak (2000)

References

External links
Idaho State Historical Society listing of justices from 1890–1993
Idaho Blue Book – 2013–14 – Judicial branch

Idaho
Justices